Stereo Total was a Berlin-based multilingual, French-German duo which comprised Françoise Cactus (born Françoise Van Hove and formerly co-leader of the West Berlin band Les Lolitas) and Brezel ('pretzel') Göring (aka Friedrich von Finsterwalde, born Friedrich Ziegler, ex-Haunted Henschel, Sigmund Freud Experience). 

Stereo Total's social media accounts reported that Françoise Cactus died from breast cancer on 17 February 2021, aged 57. As of 17 February 2021, the duo's official Instagram page states: 'Stereo Total is a Berlin-based multilingual, French-German comprising Françoise Cactus & Brezel Göring'. 

Both Cactus and Göring sung and played multiple instruments. When they appeared on stage as a duo, Cactus frequently played drums while Göring played guitar and synth; at other times the touring band has included additional musicians such as Angie Reed.

Their early career was nurtured within Berlin's easy listening scene, and they frequently supported the DJ team Le Hammond Inferno, who went on to form Bungalow Records and sign Stereo Total to their label. Stereo Total became the most successful act on Bungalow, finding an audience not just beyond Berlin but also across Europe and eventually in Japan, Brazil and the US.

Musical style
Their music is a playful, wildly eclectic mash-up of synthpop, new wave, electronica, and pop music. The most consistent element in their cut and paste compositions is a retro-hip European 1960s style, with references to psych and garage-rock as well as to 1960s French-pop in the vein of Françoise Hardy, Jacques Dutronc, France Gall, and Brigitte Bardot. Some of their most recognized tracks are kitschy lo-fi covers of pop, rock and soul songs, such as their self-consciously trashy version of Salt-N-Pepa's electro rap hit "Push It."

Their songs are primarily sung in German, French and English, but some of their output also features a number of other languages, such as Japanese, Spanish and Turkish.  The band has covered songs by: Sylvie Vartan, Françoise Hardy, Brigitte Bardot, Brigitte Fontaine, Serge Gainsbourg,  Johnny Hallyday, Velvet Underground, Nico, The Rolling Stones, The Beatles, Harpo, Pizzicato Five, Hot Chocolate, Die Tödliche Doris, Nina Hagen, KC and the Sunshine Band and Marjo (Corbeau).

Songs used in advertisements
"I Love You, Ono"—a re-titled cover version of "I Love You, Oh No!" by Japanese new wave band, Plastics—from their album My Melody, was used by Sony in a European commercial for the Handycam in June 2005, and was also featured in Robot Food's snowboarding hit "Afterbang". In 2009, the song was used in a Dell commercial for the Studio 15. In 2012 "I Love You, Ono" was used on the Dior Addict advert in the UK and Spain. In 2013 it was used as the theme music for Channel 4's Anna and Katy – the choice of the show's co-writers and performers, Anna Crilly and Katy Wix. The title of the Stereo Total version is a play on both the original Plastics title and Yoko Ono, and is a likely homage to the original's Japanese origin.

Another one of their songs, "L'Amour à trois" (the French version of the song "Liebe zu Dritt"), was used in a commercial for 3G-phones in Sweden in the fall of 2005 by the company 3, as well as by the Spanish TV Channel Cuatro in an advert for the company and in the disco scene in the independent Argentinian film "Glue". Their song "Cannibale" was included in the console game Dance Dance Revolution ULTRAMIX 4, released in November 2006. "Megaflittchen" was also used in a commercial by Estonian mobile operator EMT.

"Aua" from the Monokini album was used in the trailers and closing titles for Adam Curtis's BBC Two documentary series All Watched Over by Machines of Loving Grace.

Discography

Studio albums
1995 · Oh Ah!
1997 · Monokini
1998 · Juke-Box Alarm
1999 · My Melody
2001 · Musique Automatique
2005 · Do the Bambi
2007 · Paris-Berlin
2010 · Baby ouh!
2012 · Cactus versus Brezel
2016 · Les Hormones
2019 · Ah! Quel Cinéma!

Compilations 
1998 · Stereo Total
2000 · Total Pop
2002 · Trésors cachés [Hidden Treasures] [available free on their website]
2003 · Party Anticonformiste
2003 · Party Anticonformista
2007 · Party Anticonformiste (The Bungalow Years)
2008 · Grandes Exitos
2009 · No Controles
2009 · Carte postale de Montréal
2015 · Yéyé Existentialiste

Soundtracks albums 
2011 · Underwater Love (Onna no kappa) (Shinji Imaoka)
2014 · Ruined Heart: Another Lovestory Between a Criminal & a Whore (Pusong wasak) (Khavn De La Cruz)

Remix album 
2006 · Discotheque

References

External links

Stereo Total in Chaos Control Digizine

1993 establishments in Germany
2021 disestablishments in Germany
German pop music groups
Organisations based in Berlin
German new wave musical groups
German electronic music groups
Musical groups established in 1993
Musical groups disestablished in 2021